James Forrest Buchanan (July 1, 1876 – June 15, 1949) was a professional baseball player.  He was a right-handed pitcher over parts of one season (1905) with the St. Louis Browns.  For his career, he compiled a 5–9 record in 22 appearances, with a 3.50 earned run average and 54 strikeouts. Buchanan attended Austin College and Midland Lutheran College. Not to be confused with Jim Buchanan who was a fake news reporter played by Boston Red Sox player Joe Kelly (pitcher).

See also
 List of Major League Baseball annual saves leaders

External links

1876 births
1949 deaths
Major League Baseball pitchers
Austin Kangaroos baseball players
Baseball players from Virginia
St. Louis Browns players
People from Smyth County, Virginia
Midland Warriors baseball players
Le Mars Blackbirds players
Fort Worth Panthers players
Oakland Oaks (baseball) players
St. Paul Saints (AA) players
Nashville Vols players
Little Rock Travelers players
Topeka Jayhawks players